Ilia londaridze (born September 15, 1989), is a Georgian professional basketball player who plays for BC Kavkasia Tbilisi in Georgian Super Liga

Early career
Ilia londaridze started his youth career in BC Imedi where his first coach was Levan Intskirveli. Next club Ilia played for was BC Nike where his head coach was Guram Megreladze.  Ilia played successfully  in Georgian U-20 League, before making it as a professional.

Pro career

Maccabi Tbilisi
Ilia Started his Pro career with Georgian basketball club Maccabi Tbilisi in 2008, where he played in Georgian Super League and during the time there the young basketball player made a great progress.

Dinamo Tbilisi
Next season Londaridze transferred to the most famous Georgian club, Dinamo Tbilisi

TSU Tbilisi
After playing for Dinamo Ilia was invited to play for one of the best Georgian basketball clubs TSU Tbilisi, where he quickly became a team leader and showed all of his talent. Londaridze played many amazing games for TSU and became a strong figure in Georgian Super League.

SHSS Tbilisi
In 2011 Ilia Londaridze signed a contract with one of the best Georgian clubs SHSS Tbilisi and he still plays there.

Super League career statistics

Regular season

|-
| align="left" | 2008–09
| align="left" | Maccabi Tbilisi
| 16 || 16 || 26.9 || 42.3 || 12.5 || 76.7 || 9.9 || 1 || 1.6 || .5 || 11.9
|-
| align="left" | 2009–10
| align="left" | Dinamo Tbilisi
| 18 || 15 || 24.6 || 49.1 || 100 || 59.7 || 9.7 || 1.2 || 1.1 || .8 || 15.2
|-
| align="left" | 2010–11
| align="left" | TSU Tbilisi
| 30 || 25 || 24.1 || 52.7 || 10|| 60.1 || 8.8 || 1.1 || 1.1 || .8 || 13.4
|-
| align="left" | 2011–12
| align="left" | SHSS Tbilisi
| 5 || 1 || 15 || 48.6 || 0 || 100 || 6.4 || 1.1 || .8 || .4 || 8.2
|-class="sortbottom"
| align="left" | Career
| align="left" |
| 69 || 57 || 24.2 || 48.9 || 20 || 63.6 || 9.1 || 1.1 || 1.2 || .7 || 13.1

Awards and accomplishments
Georgian Super League
Runners-up (1): (2011)
Dudu Dadiani Memorial
Winners (1): (2011)
Dudu Dadiani Memorial
Best Player (1): (2011)
Dudu Dadiani Memorial
Best Center (1): (2011)
Georgian All-Star Game
Winner (1): (2011)

References
 Sportall.ambebi.ge interview
 Worldsport.ge interview
 Worldsport.ge interview
 MLBB.gr stats. February 22, 2011
 MLBB.gr stats. March 8, 2011

External links
Superleague.ge profile 
Eurobasket.com profile 

1989 births
Living people
Centers (basketball)
Men's basketball players from Georgia (country)
Power forwards (basketball)
Basketball players from Tbilisi